In signal processing, noise is a general term for unwanted (and, in general, unknown) modifications that a signal may suffer during capture, storage, transmission, processing, or conversion.

Sometimes the word is also used to mean signals that are random (unpredictable) and carry no useful information; even if they are not interfering with other signals or may have been introduced intentionally, as in comfort noise.

Noise reduction, the recovery of the original signal from the noise-corrupted one, is a very common goal in the design of signal processing systems, especially filters.  The mathematical limits for noise removal are set by information theory.

Types of noise 
Signal processing noise can be classified by its statistical properties (sometimes called the "color" of the noise) and by how it modifies the intended signal:
 Additive noise, gets added to the intended signal
 White noise
 Additive white Gaussian noise
 Black noise
 Gaussian noise
 Pink noise or flicker noise, with 1/f power spectrum
 Brownian noise, with 1/f2 power spectrum
 Contaminated Gaussian noise, whose PDF is a linear mixture of Gaussian PDFs
 Power-law noise
 Cauchy noise
 Multiplicative noise, multiplies or modulates the intended signal
 Quantization error, due to conversion from continuous to discrete values
 Poisson noise, typical of signals that are rates of discrete events
 Shot noise, e.g. caused by static electricity discharge
 Transient noise, a short pulse followed by decaying oscillations
 Burst noise, powerful but only during short intervals
 Phase noise, random time shifts in a signal

Noise in specific kinds of signals 
Noise may arise in signals of interest to various scientific and technical fields, often with specific features:
 Noise (audio), such as "hiss" or "hum", in audio signals
 Background noise, due to spurious sounds during signal capture
 Comfort noise, added to voice communications to fill silent gaps
 Electromagnetically induced noise, audible noise due to electromagnetic vibrations in systems involving electromagnetic fields
 Noise (video), such as "snow"
 Noise (radio), such as "static", in radio transmissions
 Image noise, affects images, usually digital ones
 Salt and pepper noise or spike noise, scattered very dark or very light pixels
 Fixed pattern noise, that is tied to pixel sensors
 Shadow noise, made visible by increasing brightness or contrast
 Speckle noise, typical of radar imaging and interferograms
 Film grain in analog photography
 Compression artifacts or "mosquito noise" around edges in JPEG and other formats
 Noise (electronics) in electrical signals
 Johnson–Nyquist noise, in semiconductors
 Quantum noise
 Quantum 1/f noise, a disputed theory about quantum systems
 Generation-recombination noise, in semiconductor devices
 Oscillator phase noise, random fluctuations of the phase of an oscillator
 Barkhausen effect or Barkhausen noise, in the strength of a ferromagnet
 Spectral splatter or switch noise, caused by on/off transmitter switching
 Ground noise, appearing at the ground terminal of audio equipment
 Synaptic noise, observed in neuroscience
 Neuronal noise, observed in neuroscience
 Transcriptional noise in the transcription of genes to proteins
 Cosmic noise, in radioastronomy
 Phonon noise in materials science
 Internet background noise, packets sent to unassigned or inactive IP addresses
 Fano noise, in particle detectors
 Mode partition noise in optical cables
 Seismic noise, spurious ground vibrations in seismology
 Cosmic microwave background, microwave noise left over from the Big Bang

Measures of noise in signals 
A long list of noise measures have been defined to measure noise in signal processing: in absolute terms, relative to some standard noise level, or relative to the desired signal level.  They include: 
 Dynamic range, often defined by inherent noise level
 Signal-to-noise ratio (SNR), ratio of noise power to signal power
 Peak signal-to-noise ratio, maximum SNR in a system
 Signal to noise ratio (imaging), for images
 Carrier-to-noise ratio, the signal-to-noise ratio of a modulated signal
 Noise power
 Noise figure
 Noise-equivalent flux density, a measure of noise in astronomy
 Noise floor
 Noise margin, by how much a signal exceeds the noise level
 Reference noise, a reference level for electronic noise
 Noise spectral density, noise power per unit of bandwidth
 Noise temperature
 Effective input noise temperature
 Noise-equivalent power, a measure of sensitivity for photodetectors
 Relative intensity noise, in a laser beam
 Antenna noise temperature, measure of noise in telecommunications antenna
 Received noise power, noise at a telecommunications receiver
 Circuit noise level, ratio of circuit noise to some reference level
 Channel noise level, some measure of noise in a communication channel
 Noise-equivalent target, intensity of a target when the signal-to-noise level is 1
 Equivalent noise resistance, a measure of noise based on equivalent resistor
 Carrier-to-receiver noise density, ratio of received carrier power to receiver noise
 Carrier-to-noise-density ratio,
 Spectral signal-to-noise ratio
 Antenna gain-to-noise temperature, a measure of antenna performance
 Contrast-to-noise ratio, a measure of image quality
 Noise print, statistical signature of ambient noise for its suppression
 Equivalent pulse code modulation noise, measure of noise by comparing to PCM quantization noise

Technology for noise in signals 
Almost every technique and device for signal processing has some connection to noise.  Some random examples are:
 Noise shaping
 Antenna analyzer or noise bridge, used to measure the efficiency of antennas
 Noise gate
 Noise generator, a circuit that produces a random electrical signal
 Radio noise source used to calibrate radiotelescopes
 Friis formulas for the noise in telecommunications
 Noise-domain reflectometry, uses existing signals to find cable faults
 Noise-immune cavity-enhanced optical heterodyne molecular spectroscopy

See also 
 Anti-information
 Noise (electronics)
 Signal-to-noise statistic, a mathematical formula to measure the difference of two values relative to their standard deviations

References 

Signal processing